Matías Fernando Ramirez Palacios (born 5 February 1996) is a Chilean footballer who plays for Deportes Recoleta as a striker.

Club career
Born in Santiago, Ramírez was a prolific goalscorer at Palestino's youth setup. In the 2012 summer, aged only 15, he was bought by Udinese Calcio, with the deal only being completed in 2014, due to his age.

Ramírez was promoted to Palestino's first team in January 2013, and made his professional debut on 9 November, replacing Pablo Tamburrini in the 57th minute and scoring the winner in a 2–1 home success against Cobresal. He appeared in nine league games during the campaign, scoring three goals.

On 12 August 2014 Ramírez signed a five-year deal with Udinese, Granada CF's parent club, and was assigned to Granada CF B in Segunda División B.

On 26 January 2017, Matias has been released from Granada.

References

External links
Granada official profile 

1996 births
Living people
People from Santiago
People from Santiago Province, Chile
People from Santiago Metropolitan Region
Footballers from Santiago
Chilean footballers
Chile youth international footballers
Chile under-20 international footballers
Chilean expatriate footballers
Association football forwards
2015 South American Youth Football Championship players
Club Deportivo Palestino footballers
Udinese Calcio players
Club Recreativo Granada players
Everton de Viña del Mar footballers
C.D. Huachipato footballers
Deportes La Serena footballers
Independiente de Cauquenes footballers
Deportes Colina footballers
Deportes Recoleta footballers
Chilean Primera División players
Primera B de Chile players
Segunda División Profesional de Chile players
Segunda División B players
Chilean expatriate sportspeople in Spain
Expatriate footballers in Italy
Expatriate footballers in Spain
Chilean expatriate sportspeople in Italy